Avrămeşti may refer to several villages in Romania:

 Avrămeşti, a commune in Harghita County
 Avrămeşti, a village in Arieșeni Commune, Alba County
 Avrămeşti, a village in Avram Iancu Commune, Alba County
 Avrămeşti, a village in Luduş town, Mureș County
 Avrămeşti, a village in Voineşti Commune, Vaslui County
 Avrămeşti, a village in Scundu Commune, Vâlcea County